Thangthong Klongjan (formerly: Tongdaeng Klongjan (ทองแดง คลองจันทร์); August 13, 1978 – May 26, 2012), known as  Thangthong Kiettaweesuk (แท่งทอง เกียรติทวีสุข) is a late Thai professional boxer and amateur boxer who fought in Bantamweight and Super bantamweight division.

Boxing career
Thangthong (nicknamed: Daeng; แดง) was born on August 13, 1978 at a remote village in Tambon Nong Bon, Amphoe Bo Rai, Trat province. he started his boxing career as a Muay Thai kickboxer which he got a moderate success, occupying the Muay Thai 105lb title of famous Lumpinee Boxing Stadium during 1999–2001.  Then, he turned to amateur boxing, being a member of the Thailand national team and winning a bronze medal Bantamweight in the 2005 SEA Games at Manila, Philippines.

Later in 2007 he turned to professional boxing and won the IBF Pan Pacific Bantamweight title in his seventh fight by defeating North Korean boxer, I-hon Kim on November 23, 2007 at Bangkok Bus Terminal (Morchit), Chatuchak District, Bangkok and defended all 10 times.

In 2010 he won the vacant WBC International Bantamweight by points over Kenyan boxer, Nick Otieno at Ratchaburi province and he defended his IBF title 15 time by defeating the points over Richard Samosir an Indonesian challenger on May 20, 2011 at Rayong province.

On May 18, 2012 he won the IBF Junior featherweight interim title over Macbute Sinyabi South Africans by KO in the 10th round at Nakhon Ratchasima province in the elimination fight for winner to challenge with the winner of the IBF-WBO unification fight between Nonito Donaire and Jeffrey Mathebula in order of IBF.

Car accident
But after only eight days on May 26, 2012 he was tragically killed in a car accident with his family, including Theeraporn Klongjan his wife and twin nephews at Sukhumvit Road, Chanthaburi province which also ended his record to 24-0 (17KOs).

Titles in Boxing
Regional/International Titles:
IBF Pan Pacific Bantamweight Champion (November 2007) (118 lbs)
WBC International Bantamweight Champion (December 2010) (118 lbs)
IBF Interim Junior Bantamweight Champion (May 2012) (122 lbs)

References

External links
 

2012 deaths
1978 births
Bantamweight boxers
Thangthong Kiattaweesuk
Thangthong Kiattaweesuk
Super-bantamweight boxers
Southpaw boxers
Thangthong Kiattaweesuk
Road incident deaths in Thailand
Thangthong Kiattaweesuk
Southeast Asian Games medalists in boxing
Competitors at the 2005 Southeast Asian Games